A sharper is an older term, common since the seventeenth-century, for thieves who use trickery to part an owner with his or her money or other possessions. Sharpers vary from what are now known as con-men by virtue of the simplicity of their cons, which often were impromptu, rather than carefully orchestrated, though those certainly happened as well. The 1737 Dictionary of Thieving Slang defines a sharper as "A Cheat, One who lives by his wits". In the nineteenth century, and into today, the term is more closely associated with gambling.

Sharpers were romantic figures in the eighteenth-century, valued as imaginative figures for their perceived social independence and ability to create new social networks of gangs. The appeal of an independent society, operating outside the law, has been imaginatively evocative for centuries, but in eighteenth-century London philosophical thought, influenced by Thomas Hobbes and Rousseau's new formulations of social contract, the romanticization of thievery reached new levels. John Gay's The Beggar's Opera and Henry Fielding's novel Jonathan Wild are only two examples of sharpers as heroes, in these cases, to provide satirical ammunition against Robert Walpole, the British Prime Minister.

See also
 Card sharp

External links

Rictor Norton's eighteenth-century newspaper reports of sharpers

Thieves